Long-nosed bat may refer to:

 Saussure's long-nosed bats or Mexican long-nosed bats, genus Leptonycteris
Southern long-nosed bat, Leptonycteris curasoae   
Big long-nosed bat, greater long-nosed bat  or Mexican long-nosed bat, Leptonycteris nivalis
Lesser long-nosed bat or Mexican long-nosed bat, Leptonycteris yerbabuenae
 Minor long-nosed long-tongued bat, Choeroniscus minor
 Puerto Rican long-nosed bat, Monophyllus frater

Note the ambiguity of the vernacular name Mexican long-nosed bat.

Animal common name disambiguation pages